Grey Gardens is a 2009 American biographical drama television film about the lives of Edith Bouvier Beale/"Little Edie", played by Drew Barrymore, and her mother Edith Ewing Bouvier/"Big Edie", played by Jessica Lange. Co-stars include Jeanne Tripplehorn as Jacqueline Kennedy (Little Edie's cousin) and Ken Howard as Phelan Beale (Little Edie's father). The film, directed by Michael Sucsy and co-written by Sucsy and Patricia Rozema, flashes back and forth between various events and dates ranging from Little Edie as a young débutante in 1936 moving with her mother to their Grey Gardens estate through the filming and premiere of the actual 1975 documentary Grey Gardens.

Filming began on October 22, 2007, in the Hamptons. It premiered on HBO on April 18, 2009.

The film was nominated for 17 Primetime Emmy Awards, winning six including Outstanding Made for Television Movie, Outstanding Lead Actress in a Miniseries or a Movie (for Lange) and Outstanding Supporting Actor in a Miniseries or a Movie (for Howard). It was also nominated for three Golden Globe Awards, winning two for Best Miniseries or Made for Television Movie and Best Actress – Miniseries or Television Film (for Barrymore). It was also nominated for two Screen Actors Guild Awards for Outstanding Performance by a Female Actor in a Miniseries or Television Movie, winning one (for Barrymore). The film also won the 2009 Television Critics Association Award for Outstanding Achievement in Movies, Miniseries and Specials.

Plot 
The film is based on the life stories of the eccentric paternal aunt and first cousin of Jackie Kennedy, both named Edith Bouvier Beale. The elder Edith Bouvier Beale was the sister of Jackie Kennedy's father John Vernou Bouvier III and was referred to as "Big Edie", her daughter was referred to as "Little Edie". The Beale women were members of NYC high society, but in their later years, withdrew from the New York City life, taking shelter at their Long Island summer home/estate Grey Gardens. The house eventually fell into a state of disrepair that gave the Beale women notoriety.

Phelan Beale (husband of "Big Edie" and father of "Little Edie"), eventually divorced "Big Edie." In the movie, "Little Edie" decides to move to New York to pursue a career in acting (as well as an ill-fated romance with high-profile married man, Julius 'Cap' Krug).  Her father frankly tells her that she has to find a husband to support her lifestyle.  "Little Edie" sadly and slowly realizes her fate is to remain her mother's companion at Grey Gardens. The two women become reclusive and known around town as the highly eccentric proprietors of Grey Gardens, which has become decrepit and full of stray animals taken in by the Beale women. The plot includes the filming of the documentary Grey Gardens by Albert and David Maysles as well as flashback events in the Beales' past, including their arrival at the estate, the disintegration of Big Edie's marriage, and Little Edie's failed attempts to have her own life and find independence.

After Phelan Beale dies, the two sons tell their mother, Big Edie, that there is little money and she should sell the estate and move to Florida. The house was in her name and this was her home. She was going nowhere. Grey Gardens became a health hazard, overrun with cats and also infested with raccoons. Health officials condemned the home and newspaper articles ran blaming Jackie Kennedy. Jackie goes to the home in a chauffeur-driven limousine for a visit. Jackie and her sister, Lee, pay for the cleanup and restoration of the Hamptons home. Mom and daughter grow old together. The documentary is finished and Little Edie attends the premiere, wearing a surprise gift from her mother.

The movie ends with Little Edie singing "Tea for Two" at the Reno Sweeney cabaret in Greenwich Village, and the quote, "My mother gave me a truly priceless life."

Cast 

 Drew Barrymore as 'Little' Edith Bouvier Beale
 Jessica Lange as 'Big' Edith Bouvier Beale
 Jeanne Tripplehorn as Jacqueline Kennedy Onassis
 Ken Howard as Phelan Beale
 Kenneth Welsh as Max Gordon
 Arye Gross as Albert Maysles
 Justin Louis as David Maysles
 Daniel Baldwin as Julius Krug
 Malcolm Gets as George 'Gould' Strong
 Louis Grise as Young Buddy Beale
 Joshua Peace as Adult Buddy Beale
 Neil Babcock as Young Phelan Beale Jr.
 Ben Carlson as Adult Phelan Beale Jr.
 Olivia Waldriff as Young Jackie Bouvier
 Neil Girvan as Concierge

Production 
Michael Sucsy said that he used primary sources to flesh out the story including letters and journals kept by Little Edie. He also interviewed family members and friends including Lois Wright who lived in the house and wrote her own book about the events. Albert Maysles is credited as a source in the movie. Sucsy said that the house facade as well as the interior were created from blueprints. Sucsy said that an aerial shot of the house circa 1936 was historically accurate on the placement of the house in relation to other mansions in East Hampton at the time (although requiring CGI enhancements to create the illusion). As with many movies based on historical events, some events in the Beales' lives, such as the timing of Big Edie and Phelan's divorce, were shifted to make a more coherent story.

The entire film was shot in Ontario, with most of the shots in metropolitan Toronto. The Valley Halla Estate in Rouge Park was the setting of exterior shots of Grey Gardens. Waterfront shots were on Centre Island in the Toronto Islands. Hotel shots were at the Fairmont Royal York. Studio work was done at Toronto Film Studios.

The aerial shot of The Pierre was licensed from An Affair to Remember.

Post-production was done in New York and Los Angeles. The DVD commentary was done in the same studio where the Maysles mixed the original documentary.

Reception

Critical response 
The movie has been lauded by many critics. Review aggregator Rotten Tomatoes reports that 100% out of 10 professional critics gave the film a positive review. Ben Lyons from At the Movies raved: "Drew Barrymore is fantastic in this film." Rolling Stone critic Peter Travers also raved: "The script hits a few bumps, but Jessica Lange and Drew Barrymore are magnificent as the bizarro Beales. Barrymore is a revelation. Aging into her 60s and transformed in voice and bearing, she finds Edie's unquenchable spirit. Brava."

Awards and nominations

Soundtrack 

The Academy Award-winning composer Rachel Portman provided the film score. In addition to Prague Philharmonic Orchestra, the album includes vocal performances by the movie's lead actresses, Jessica Lange (on "We Belong Together" and "I Won't Dance" sung with Malcolm Gets) and Drew Barrymore (on "Tea for Two").

Track list

Additional credits

See also 
 Grey Gardens (documentary)
 Grey Gardens (musical)
 Grey Gardens (estate)

Notes

References

External links 
 
 
 Barrymore Enters "The Monastery Of Edie"; NPR Fresh Air's Terry Gross interviews Drew Barrymore in-depth about her work in Grey Gardens

2009 television films
2009 films
2009 biographical drama films
2000s American films
2000s English-language films
2000s female buddy films
American biographical drama films
American drama television films
American female buddy films
Beale family
Best Miniseries or Television Movie Golden Globe winners
Biographical television films
Bouvier family
Cultural depictions of American women
Cultural depictions of Jacqueline Kennedy Onassis
Cultural depictions of socialites
Films about films
Films about mother–daughter relationships
Films directed by Michael Sucsy
Films scored by Rachel Portman
Films set in New York (state)
Films shot in Toronto
Flower Films films
HBO Films films
Primetime Emmy Award for Outstanding Made for Television Movie winners